Asian Highway 86 (AH86) is a road in the Asian Highway Network running 247 km (154 miles) from Aşkale to Trabzon, Turkey. The route is concurrent with European route E97 The route is as follows:

Turkey
 Road D915: Aşkale - Bayburt
 Road D050: Bayburt - Gümüşhane
 Road D885: Gümüşhane - Trabzon

Lack of signage 
Asian routes are not signposted in Turkey.

References 

Asian Highway Network

Roads in Turkey